Wen Zongren (November 1940 – 13 March 2008) was a general in the People's Liberation Army of China who served as political commissar of the Academy of Military Sciences from 2000 to 2005, and political commissar of the Lanzhou Military Region from 1996 to 2000. He was an alternate member of the 14th Central Committee of the Chinese Communist Party and a member of the 15th and 16th Central Committee of the Chinese Communist Party. He was a delegate to the 7th National People's Congress and a member of the 11th National Committee of the Chinese People's Political Consultative Conference.

Biography

He enlisted in the People's Liberation Army (PLA) in February 1959, and joined the Chinese Communist Party (CCP) in April 1961. He graduated from the PLA Tank School and PLA Military Academy. He served in the Nanjing Military Region for a long time. In August 1985, he became deputy party secretary of the 12th Group Army, rising to party secretary in June 1990. He also served as political commissar from August 1985 to October 1994. In October 1994, he was appointed director of the Political Department of the Nanjing Military Region, he remained in that position until January 1996, when he was transferred to Lanzhou Military Region and appointed political commissar and party secretary. He became political commissar and party secretary of the Academy of Military Sciences in June 2000, and served until December 2005. 

On 13 March 2008, he died from an illness in Beijing, at the age of 67.

He was promoted to the rank of major general (shaojiang) in September 1988, lieutenant general (zhongjiang) in January 1996, and general (shangjiang) in June 2002.

References

1940 births
2008 deaths
People from Chaohu
People's Liberation Army generals from Anhui
People's Republic of China politicians from Anhui
Chinese Communist Party politicians from Anhui
Alternate members of the 14th Central Committee of the Chinese Communist Party
Members of the 15th Central Committee of the Chinese Communist Party
Members of the 16th Central Committee of the Chinese Communist Party
Delegates to the 7th National People's Congress
Members of the 11th Chinese People's Political Consultative Conference
Political commissars of the PLA Academy of Military Science
Political commissars of the Lanzhou Military Region